MFV Bugaled Breizh is a French trawler from Loctudy, Finistère, whose sinking with all hands in 90 metres of water in the English Channel on 15 January 2004 remains unresolved. While it appeared possible that the ship was pulled under by a submarine, a specific submarine could not be identified from among the number of submarines of several nations operating in the general vicinity of the accident site.  Moreover, the condition of the ship's recovered trawling equipment was reported by a technical inquiry to not be consistent with a submarine entanglement.

The motorized fishing vessel (MFV) was built in 1986 by the Bretagne Sud shipyard in Belz. Its name means "Children of Brittany" in the Breton language.

The accident

Weather in the area at the time was southwesterly winds of 25-30 knots and 2-3 mile visibility. The ship briefly radioed that it was sinking, and disappeared apparently very quickly; only two bodies of the five sailors were recovered at the time, while a third body was recovered on 10 July 2004 during salvage operations in 90 meters of water depth.

Inquiry 
Immediately investigations were started by the French authorities in Quimper. Several explanations were advanced to explain the capsizing including a fishing accident, collision with a surface ship, rock or wreck, the presence of a sandbank, and an accident involving a submarine. In June 2004 the ship was raised for forensic examinations. The fish hold showed a compression due to the water pressure. In the absence of evidence of any ramming, the hypothesis of a collision with a surface ship could be abandoned.

Submarine entanglement theory 
Several hours after the sinking an announcement was made by the French Maritime Prefect for the Atlantic that a NATO naval exercise involving submarines was taking place in the area. The Dutch submarine  was one of the first ships to reach the site of the sinking and was suspected to be involved in the accident. The British submarine  was also suspect as it was sent for repair after the exercises. Further, there was apparently a submarine of unknown origin that was observing the NATO maneuvers.

The hypothesis that Bugaled Breizh was sunk by an accident with a submarine can explain a number of unusual observations. The ship apparently sank very rapidly, there was no launching of any rescue boat, and the help signal was brief, without giving the coordinates. The trawler line of the ship was drawn out on the port side in contrast to the starboard one. The long cable is also reported to have traces of titanium; it has been proposed that this originates from the surface of a submarine.

NATO documents have been declassified and were released to the French judiciary. The Minister of Defense Michèle Alliot-Marie indicated to the National Assembly that the information she had did not allow her to suspect a submarine as the cause of the accident. She indicated that the British and French authorities had cooperated and provided a list of all their ships and submarines in the area of interest. Also, the titanium issue was considered trivial as titanium dioxide is a common pigment of marine paint including the one used for Bugaled Breizh.

The report of the French Marine Accident Investigation Office (Bureau d'enquêtes sur les événements de mer or BEAmer) was published on 27 November  2006 and examined a number of possible causes; it rejected the proposition that fishing lines got entangled with a military submarine and concluded that "the hypothesis that the fishing line got buried in a sandbank is more consistent with the evidence." 
However, the hypothesis of a fishing accident was received with skepticism by the fishing community. It believed that the governmental BEA — it is under the jurisdiction of the Ministry of Transport — tried to avoid a diplomatic incident with the military and its allies. An analysis of the French Institute of Research for the Exploration of the Ocean subsequently rejected the proposition of BEAmer as impossible.

Expert testimony indicated that a nuclear submarine that got entangled in the net of a trawler could pull down a vessel of about 250 tons within 80 seconds.

A recent newspaper article states that an unnamed witness thought that British submarine Turbulent may have been involved in the ship's sinking. However Judge Brigette Lamy said she agreed with reports that the submarine was in Plymouth at the time.

On 9 September 2015 the British Minister for the Armed Forces, Penny Mordaunt, recognised that a British submarine caught the trawl of the Irish fishing trawler "The Karen" on 15 April 2015, in an incident similar to that of the Bugaled Breizh.

Conclusion of inquiry without specific cause
On 31 July 2008, the judges Richard Foltzer and Muriel Corre, who had been charged with the inquiry into the sinking of Bugaled Breizh, after having received expert testimony, issued a statement that a "highly probable cause" that the vessel sank was as a result of an accident with a nuclear attack submarine. However, they were unable to indicate which submarine was involved and indicated also the possibility that the accident may have been caused by the unidentified spy submarine or other technically feasible causes. As such the relatives of the dead sailors and the owner of the ship have not received any compensations.

While other causes for the ship's loss are possible, this accident and others with a clearer attribution to nuclear submarines suggest that submarines operating in fishing zones represent a danger to fishing trawlers who when "catching" a submarine may be at significant risk of being pulled under. The Celtic League indicates that accidents with submarines may have accounted for the loss of more than 20 motorized fishing vessels since 1970 with the loss of over 150 sailors and demands better communication between the military and the civilian authorities.

Media 
Book 

Television

See also

 FV Antares

References

The article is in part based on the corresponding article in the French Wikipedia from 23 February 2009

External links 
 "Technical report on the investigation of the Capsize and foundering of the trawler BUGALED BREIZH on 15 January South of Lizard Point (with the loss of 5 lives)." (Archive) Bureau d'Enquêtes sur les Événements de Mer.
  Rapport d’enquête technique BUGALED BREIZH (Archive). Bureau d'Enquêtes sur les Événements de Mer.
  breizhoo.fr Summary of events
  letelegramme.com Summary of events

Fishing vessels
Maritime incidents in 2004
Maritime incidents in England
Ships built in France
Ships of France
1986 ships
Ships lost with all hands
History of Cornwall
2004 disasters in the United Kingdom